Samesi is a village in Lucknow, India with a population of 11,646 in 2011. Samesi is known for its large vegetable market. Samesi is the only bazaar that remains open 365 days a year. Samesi comes under the Mohanlalganj Block and is the largest gram panchayat in the Mohanlalganj subdivision of Lucknow. It contains 28 majras.

There are two government clinics in Samesi; one is a homeopathic clinic and the other is Ayurvedic. There are three government-run schools along with four private schools, an inter-college and an English-medium playschool. Along with a big on-road market, there are several grocery shops and general stores across the village.

There are many mohallas/muhallas (districts or neighborhoods) in the village, namely Thakur Dwara, Bazaar Tola, Kanchan Khera, Mela, Mahua Bagh, Pajawa, Koriyayi, Diha, Singhaniya, Mahamayin, and Chamrahiya.

References

Villages in Lucknow district